Peter Houtman (born 4 June 1957 in Rotterdam) is a retired football striker from the Netherlands who obtained eight caps for the Netherlands national team in the 1980s, scoring seven goals.

Houtman played for Feyenoord Rotterdam and FC Groningen. He also had spells with Club Brugge, Sporting Portugal, Sparta Rotterdam, ADO Den Haag and Excelsior Rotterdam. For Feyenoord he scored 90 goals in 153 official matches.

External links
Feyenoord profile 

1957 births
Living people
ADO Den Haag players
Association football forwards
Belgian Pro League players
Club Brugge KV players
Dutch expatriate footballers
Dutch footballers
Eerste Divisie players
Eredivisie players
Excelsior Rotterdam players
Expatriate footballers in Belgium
Expatriate footballers in Portugal
Dutch expatriate sportspeople in Belgium
Dutch expatriate sportspeople in Portugal
FC Groningen players
Feyenoord players
Netherlands international footballers
Footballers from Rotterdam
Primeira Liga players
Sparta Rotterdam players
Sporting CP footballers
Feyenoord non-playing staff